Taufkirchen an der Trattnach is a municipality in the district of Grieskirchen in the Austrian state of Upper Austria.

Geography
Taufkirchen lies in the Hausruckviertel. About 14 percent of the municipality is forest, and 78 percent is farmland.

References

Cities and towns in Grieskirchen District